Winner Cup 2006 is the 1st edition of the Israeli basketball pre-season tournament - Winner Cup. It was played on 15 October-19 October in Jerusalem at the Malha Arena, during the jewish holiday of Sukkot. Ironi Ashkelon has won the cup after beating Maccabi Rishon LeZion 79-73 in the final.

Withdrawals
The teams that finished at the top eight places on Basketball Super League 2005–06 were supposed to compete in the tournament.

Maccabi Tel Aviv that finished 1st in the 2005-06 season has withdrawn from the tournament due to schedule problems.

Hapoel Tel Aviv that finished on the 8th place was relegated to the 2nd division due to financial problems and was not eligible to compete in the tournament.

The both teams were replaced by the 9th and 10th ranked teams - Bnei HaSharon and Ironi Ramat Gan, respectively.

Tournament Bracket
The teams were matched by their last season standings (2nd VS 10th, 3rd VS 9th, etc...).

Results

Quarter-finals

Semi-finals

Third-place game

Final

External links
 Winner Cup (Hebrew)

2006
2006–07 in Israeli basketball